Havana is a city in northwest Yell County, Arkansas, United States.  The population was 375 at the 2010 census.  It is part of the Russellville Micropolitan Statistical Area.  Arkansas Scenic State Highway 309 leads from Havana to the top of Mount Magazine, home of Arkansas's newest State Park, and the highest peak in Arkansas.

Havana is located between Booneville and Danville on State Highway 10. The area has views of Mount Magazine, the tallest mountain in Arkansas. West of Havana lies Blue Mountain Lake, a US Army Corps of Engineers Lake, which provides recreational fishing, camping, swimming and boating.

Havana is in the Petit Jean River Valley, with the Ouachita Mountain range to the south, and the Ozark Mountain range to the north.  Mount Magazine to the north provides camping, cabins, a brand new 100 room (each with an incredible view) lodge, hiking, hang gliding and rock climbing.

Havana is home to several small businesses, and the Western Yell County High School and Jr. High School Wolverines.

The area is rural, covered with timber, pastures and row crop fields.  Local industry centers on poultry, livestock and crops.  Trucking businesses, garment production, poultry equipment supplies, and wood-working industries are also present.  Natural Gas production has also increased dramatically since approximately 2004.

Although small, the City of Havana provides city water, sewer and trash service to its residents, as well as a Rural Fire Department with several pumper, tanker and brush fire trucks.

Just opened in January, 2008, was the Western Yell County Medical Clinic on AR 10 West, followed by a new High School which opened in December 2008.

Geography
Havana is located at  (35.111021, -93.529064).

Etymology

Havana was originally named Marvinville, which was changed to Gardner Station after the Civil War, then to Greenville (in honor of the person who surveyed the land) in 1903. Story I received with a map was that it was changed after a train wreck happened near the town, and there was confusion as to which Greenville due to so many towns with the same name in the country.

Demographics

As of the census of 2000, there were 392 people, 141 households, and 101 families residing in the city. The racial makeup of the city was 83.93% White, 0.77% Native American, 1.79% Asian, 11.22% from other races, and 2.30% from two or more races.  17.86% of the population were Hispanic or Latino of any race.

There were 141 households, out of which 38.3% had children under the age of 18 living with them, 55.3% were married couples living together, 13.5% had a female householder with no husband present, and 27.7% were non-families. 22.7% of all households were made up of individuals, and 10.6% had someone living alone who was 65 years of age or older.  The average household size was 2.78 and the average family size was 3.25.

In the city, the population was spread out, with 29.1% under the age of 18, 12.2% from 18 to 24, 29.8% from 25 to 44, 14.5% from 45 to 64, and 14.3% who were 65 years of age or older.  The median age was 32 years. For every 100 females, there were 107.4 males.  For every 100 females age 18 and over, there were 100.0 males.

The median income for a household in the city was $30,625, and the median income for a family was $27,500. Males had a median income of $18,558 versus $17,222 for females. The per capita income for the city was $10,963.  About 20.2% of families and 24.2% of the population were below the poverty line, including 39.1% of those under age 18 and 20.3% of those age 65 or over.

Notable people
Johnny Sain, Major League Baseball pitcher
James Elton Walkup, MLB pitcher
James Huey Walkup, MLB pitcher

References

Encyclopedia of Arkansas History & Culture
3.

Cities in Arkansas
Cities in Yell County, Arkansas
Arkansas placenames of Native American origin
Russellville, Arkansas micropolitan area